was an old province of Japan in the area of Fukushima, Miyagi, Iwate and Aomori Prefectures and the municipalities of Kazuno and Kosaka in Akita Prefecture.

The term  is often used to refer to the combined area of Mutsu and the neighboring province Dewa, which together make up the entire Tōhoku region.

History

Invasion by the Kinai government
Mutsu, on northern Honshū, was one of the last provinces to be formed as land was taken from the indigenous Emishi, and became the largest as it expanded northward. The ancient regional capital of the Kinai government was Tagajō in present-day Miyagi Prefecture.

 709 (Wadō 2, 3rd month), an uprising against governmental authority took place in Mutsu and in nearby Echigo Province. Troops were dispatched to subdue the revolt.
 712 (Wadō 5), Mutsu was separated from Dewa Province. Empress Genmei's Daijō-kan made cadastral changes in the provincial map of the Nara period, as in the following year when Mimasaka Province was split from Bizen Province, Hyūga Province was sundered from Ōsumi Province, and Tanba Province was severed from Tango Province.
 718, Shineha, Uda and Watari districts of the Mutsu Province, Kikuta, Iwaki districts of the Hitachi Province are incorporated into Iwaki Province (718).
 801, Mutsu was conquered by Sakanoue no Tamuramaro.
 869 (Jōgan 10, 5th month): A terrible earthquake struck Mutsu. More than 1,000 people lost their lives in the disaster.

Prosperity of Hiraizumi
In 1095, the Ōshū Fujiwara clan settled at Hiraizumi, under the leadership of Fujiwara no Kiyohira.  Kiyohira hoped to "form a city rivaling Kyoto as a centre of culture".  The legacy of the Ōshū Fujiwara clan remains with the temples Chūson-ji and Mōtsū-ji in Hiraizumi, and the Shiramizu Amidadō temple building in Iwaki. In 1189, Minamoto no Yoritomo invaded Mutsu with three great forces, eventually killing Fujiwara no Yasuhira and acquiring the entire domain.

Sengoku period
During the Sengoku period, clans ruled parts of the province.

The Nanbu clan at Morioka in the north.
The Date clan at Iwadeyama and Sendai in the south.
The Sōma clan at Nakamura in the south.
The Iwaki clan at Iinodaira in the south.
The Uesugi clan had a castle town at Wakamatsu in the south.

After the Boshin War

As a result of the Boshin War, Mutsu Province was divided by the Meiji government, on 19 January 1869, into five provinces: Iwashiro, Iwaki, Rikuzen, Rikuchū, and Rikuō). The fifth of these, corresponding roughly to today's Aomori Prefecture, was assigned the same two kanji as the entire province prior to division; however, the character reading was different. Due to the similarity in characters in the name, this smaller province has also sometimes been referred to as 'Mutsu'.

Districts

Under Ritsuryō 
Iwase District (磐瀬郡)
Aizu District (会津郡)
Yama District (耶麻郡)
Asaka District (安積郡)
Adachi District (安達郡)
Shinobu District (信夫郡)
Katta District (刈田郡)
Shibata District (柴田郡)
Natori District (名取郡)
Kikuta District (菊多郡)
Iwaki District (石城郡)
Shineha District (標葉郡)
Namekata District (行方郡)
Uda District (宇多郡)
Esashi District (江刺郡)
Igu District (伊具郡)
Watari District (亘理郡)
Miyagi District (宮城郡)
Kurokawa District (黒川郡)
Kami District (賀美郡)
Shikama District (色麻郡)
Tamatsukuri District (玉造郡)
Shida District (志太郡)
Kurihara District (栗原郡)
Iwai District (磐井郡) (split into East-Iwai and West-Iwai districts in Iwate Prefecture)
Isawa District (膽沢郡)
Nagaoka District (長岡郡) (distinct from the one in Kōchi Prefecture)
Niita District (新田郡) (distinct from the one in Gunma Prefecture)
Oda District (小田郡) (now in the city of Tome, Miyagi Prefecture)
Tōda District (遠田郡)
Kesen District (気仙郡)
Oshika District (牡鹿郡)
Tome District (登米郡)
Monou District (桃生郡)
Ōnuma District (大沼郡)

Meiji Era 
Aomori Prefecture
Tsugaru District (津軽郡)
Kita District (北郡)
Sannohe District (三戸郡)
Iwate Prefecture
Ninohe District (二戸郡)

See also
 Sanriku
 Tōhoku region
 Tōsandō
 , the World War II Imperial Japanese Navy warship named after the province.
 Dewa Province

Notes

References
 Nussbaum, Louis-Frédéric and Käthe Roth. (2005). Japan encyclopedia. Cambridge: Harvard University Press. ; OCLC 58053128
 Titsingh, Isaac. (1834).  Annales des empereurs du Japon (Nihon Ōdai Ichiran).  Paris: Royal Asiatic Society, Oriental Translation Fund of Great Britain and Ireland. OCLC 5850691.

External links 

 Murdoch's map of provinces, 1903

 
Former provinces of Japan
Mutsu Province
Mutsu Province